The 2013–14 season was Livingston's first season in the new formed Scottish Championship and their third consecutive season in the second-tier of Scottish football, having been promoted from the Scottish Second Division during the 2010–11 season. Livingston also competed in the Challenge Cup, League Cup and the Scottish Cup.

Summary

Management
Livingston began the 2013–14 season under the management of Richie Burke who had been appointed in February 2013. On the 12 September, Burke resigned from his position as manager following a poor start to the season and was replaced by former Hearts manager John McGlynn.

Results and fixtures

Pre Season

Scottish Championship

Scottish Challenge Cup

Scottish League Cup

Scottish Cup

Player statistics

|-
|colspan="12"|Players who left the club during the 2013–14 season
|-

|}

Team Statistics

League table

Division summary

Transfers

Players in

Players out

See also
List of Livingston F.C. seasons

References

Livingston
Livingston F.C. seasons